Anzeha (also Romanized as Anzehā, Anzeh-ha, and Anzhā; also known as Izha) is a village in Hablerud Rural District, in the Central District of Firuzkuh County, Tehran Province, Iran. At the 2006 census, its population was 592, in 193.
The people of Anzeha speak Mazandarani. Anzeha was once part of Mazandaran Provience so many years ago.
 families.

References 

Populated places in Firuzkuh County